The 2022 South Carolina Attorney General election took place on November 8, 2022, to elect the Attorney General of South Carolina. Incumbent Republican Attorney General Alan Wilson ran for a fourth term. The only two candidates to file for the election were Republicans Wilson and another Republican attorney, Lauren Martel.

Republican primary

Candidates

Declared
Lauren Martel, attorney
Alan Wilson, incumbent attorney general

Endorsements

Results

Democratic primary

Candidates
No Democratic candidates filed to run.

Declined
David Pascoe, solicitor for the first judicial circuit of South Carolina

General election

Predictions

See also
South Carolina Attorney General

Notes

References

Attorney General
South Carolina
South Carolina Attorney General elections